The South Korea national under-18 baseball team is the national under-18 team representing South Korea in international baseball competitions. The organization is currently ranked 3rd in the world by the World Baseball Softball Confederation.  They compete in the bi-annual U-18 Baseball World Cup. They have won the tournament five times.

See also
 South Korea national baseball team
 Korea Baseball Association
 U-18 Baseball World Cup

References

National under-18
National under-18 baseball teams
Baseball under-18